Counties 1 Southern North (formerly known as Southern Counties North) is a division at level 7 of the English rugby union system.  When league rugby first began in 1987 it was a single league known as Southern Counties but since 1996 the division was split into two regional leagues - Southern Counties North and Southern Counties South.  Counties 1 Southern North currently sits at the seventh tier of club rugby union in England and primarily featuring teams based in Berkshire, Buckinghamshire and Oxfordshire.

The league champions at the end of each season are automatically promoted to Regional 2 South Central. Relegated teams usually drop to Counties 2 Berks/Bucks & Oxon North or Counties 2 Berks/Bucks & Oxon South.

2021-22

2020–21
Due to the coronavirus pandemic the season was cancelled.

2019-20

2018-19

2017-18

2016-17

2015–16
The 2015–16 Southern Counties North consisted of twelve teams; six from Buckinghamshire, two each from Berkshire and Oxfordshire, and one each from Gloucestershire and Wiltshire. The season started on 12 September 2015 and the last league matches were played on 23 April 2016.

Seven of the twelve teams participated in last season's competition. The 2014–15 champions High Wycombe were promoted to the South West 1 East while Milton Keynes and Alchester were relegated to the Berks/Bucks & Oxon Premier.  Royal Wootton Bassett, who finished 4th, were level transferred to Southern Counties South.

2014–15

Alchester
Aylesbury
Beaconsfield
Bicester (promoted from Berks/Bucks & Oxon Premier)
Drifters
High Wycombe
Marlow (relegated from South West 1 East)
Milton Keynes
Royal Wotton Bassett
Stow-on-the-Wold
Thatcham
Wallingford

2013–14 
Alchester
Aylesbury
Bletchley
Drifters
High Wycombe
Milton Keynes
Reading Abbey
Royal Wotton Bassett
Stow-on-the-Wold
Swindon College Old Boys
Thatcham
Wallingford

2012–13

Alchester
Aylesbury
Buckingham
Drifters
Grove
Milton Keynes
Olney
Reading Abbey
Slough
Tadley
Thatcham
Wallingford

Original teams
When league rugby began in 1987 this division (known as Southern Counties) contained the following teams:

Aylesbury
Banbury
Bletchley
Bracknell 
Marlow
Oxford Marathon
Oxford Old Boys
Redingensians
Swindon
Wimborne
Windsor

Southern Counties North honours

Southern Counties (1987–1993)

Originally Southern Counties North and Southern Counties South were combined in a single division called Southern Counties.  It was a tier 7 league with promotion up to South West 2 and relegation down to either Berks/Dorset/Wilts 1 or Bucks/Oxon 1.

Southern Counties (1993–1996)

At the end of the 1992–93 season the top six teams from London Division 1 and the top six from South West Division 1 were combined to create National 5 South.  This meant that Southern Counties dropped from a tier 7 league to a tier 8 league for the years that National 5 South was active.  Promotion continued to South West 2 and relegation down to either Berks/Dorset/Wilts 1 or Bucks/Oxon 1.

Southern Counties North (1996–2000)

Restructuring by the RFU at the end of the 1995–96 season saw Southern Counties split into two separate leagues, Southern Counties North and Southern Counties South, which reverted to tier 7 leagues due to the cancellation of National 5 South.  Promotion from Southern Counties North was now to the new South West 2 East while relegation was now only to Bucks/Oxon 1.

Southern Counties North (2000–2009)

Southern Counties North remained a tier 7 league, with promotion continuing to South West 2 East.  However, the transfer of Berkshire clubs from the Dorset/Wilts leagues to the Bucks/Oxon leagues, meant that relegation was now to new Berks/Bucks & Oxon 1 (formerly Bucks/Oxon 1).

Southern Counties North (2009–present)

Despite widespread league restructuring by the RFU, Southern Counties North continued as a tier 7 league, with promotion to South West 1 East (formerly South West 2 East) and relegation to Berks/Bucks & Oxon Premier.

Promotion play-offs
Since the 2000–01 season there has been a play-off between the runners-up of Southern Counties North and Southern Counties South for the third and final promotion place to South West 1 East. The team with the superior league record has home advantage in the tie.  At the end of the 2019–20 season Southern Counties North teams have been the most successful with twelve wins to the Southern Counties South teams seven; and the home team has won promotion on thirteen occasions compared to the away teams six.

Number of league titles

High Wycombe (3)
Witney (3)
Banbury (2)
Beaconsfield (2)
Bletchley (2)
Buckingham (2)
Marlow (2)
Olney (2)
Redingensians (2)
Windsor (2)
Amersham & Chiltern (1)
Aylesbury (1)
Bournemouth (1)
Dorchester (1)
Oxford Harlequins (1)
Reading Abbey (1)
Sherborne (1)
Slough (1)
Stow-on-the-Wold (2)
Swanage & Wareham (1)
Swindon (1)

See also
 South West Division RFU
 Berkshire RFU
 Buckinghamshire RFU
 Oxfordshire RFU
 English rugby union system
 Rugby union in England

Notes

References 

7
Rugby union in Berkshire
Rugby union in Buckinghamshire
Rugby union in Gloucestershire
Rugby union in Oxfordshire